Fernando Garcia (born May 22, 1999) is an American soccer player who currently plays for FC Tucson in USL League One.

Playing career

College & amateur
Garcia attended South Mecklenburg High School, who he helped to capture the 2015 State Championship after finishing the season undefeated. Garcia was also captain of the Charlotte Soccer Academy U18 team in his senior year.

In 2017, Garcia committed to playing college soccer at the University of North Carolina at Charlotte. In his single seasons with the 49ers, Garcia made 17 appearances, scoring two goals and adding one assist. In 2018, he transferred to Eastern Florida State College, but didn't compete with their soccer team. 2019 saw Garcia play with Northeast Texas Community College, where he went on to score seven goals in 18 appearances, and earned United Soccer Coaches Men's Junior College Division I All-South Region Teams Second-Team honors. Garcia again transferred in 2020, this time to play with the University of North Carolina at Greensboro, where he played across the 2020-21 and 2021 seasons, truncated due to the COVID-19 pandemic. Here he scored seven goals in 31 games, finishing with four assists to his name and was named First Team All-SoCon.

During his time at college, Garcia also appeared in the USL League Two with Flint City Bucks during their 2021 season. Here he scored a single goal in ten appearances across the regular season and playoffs. In 2022, Garcia again played in the USL League Two, competing with Des Moines Menace, scoring three goals in four appearances, including an effort against St. Croix SC, which received coverage on ESPN's SportsCenter.

FC Tucson
On June 21, 2022, Garcia signed with USL League One side FC Tucson. He bagged his first professional goal on June 25, 2022, scoring the game winning goal in a 2–1 win over Chattanooga Red Wolves.

References 

1999 births
American soccer players
Association football forwards
Charlotte 49ers men's soccer players
Des Moines Menace players
Flint City Bucks players
Living people
Soccer players from Charlotte, North Carolina
Soccer players from North Carolina
FC Tucson players
UNC Greensboro Spartans men's soccer players
USL League One players
USL League Two players